State Trunk Highway 16 (often called Highway 16, STH-16 or WIS 16) is a Wisconsin state highway running from Pewaukee across the state to La Crosse. Much of its route in the state parallels the former mainline of the Milwaukee Road and current mainline of the Canadian Pacific Railway. Interstate 90 (I-90) or I-94 parallels Highway 16 for most of its length in the state. It serves local traffic in nearby cities including La Crosse, Tomah, Wisconsin Dells, Portage, Columbus, Watertown, Oconomowoc and Waukesha. The highway is mainly two-lane surface road or urban multi-lane expressway from La Crosse to Oconomowoc, and it is a freeway east of Oconomowoc.

Route description

WIS 16 enters from Minnesota via a connection with Trunk Highway 16 on the Mississippi River, running concurrently with US Highway 14 (US 14) and US 61. After the two US Highways turn south to follow 3rd Street in downtown La Crosse, WIS 16 passes through La Crosse via Cass Street, 7th Street and La Crosse Street, crossing WIS 35 at La Crosse Street and Lang Drive. WIS 16 passes the northern edge of the University of Wisconsin–La Crosse campus, then turns north at Losey Boulevard.

WIS 16 becomes a parallel route to I-90 and passes through West Salem where it connects with WIS 108. Wisconsin Highway 162 junctions just north of Bangor. WIS 16 crosses into Monroe County in Rockland. WIS 16 enters Sparta and junctions with WIS 21, WIS 27, and WIS 71. WIS 16 provides access to the Elroy-Sparta State Bike Trail.

The route then follows I-90 very closely as a frontage road to Tomah where it junctions with WIS 131 and joins US 12. The highways continue paralleling I-90 and I-94 southeast and pass through Oakdale and into Juneau County.

WIS 16 and US 12 pass through Camp Douglas and cross WIS 80 in New Lisbon. The highways then junction with WIS 58 and WIS 82 in Mauston as they continue southeast. The routes slowly trek eastward and pass through Lyndon Station where Rocky Arbor State Park is located. The highways turn southeast again and crossing the Interstates and into Sauk County and Wisconsin Dells.

WIS 16 turns east off of US 12 onto WIS 13 north and passes through downtown Wisconsin Dells and into Columbia County. WIS 23 East also joins the highways at the same point. WIS 16 follows the Wisconsin River into Portage, meeting the other terminus of WIS 127 at the interchange with I-39.

WIS 16 turns east off the US route and crosses WIS 22 in Wyocena and passes through Rio, Doylestown and Fall River. WIS 60 joins WIS 16 and together, they cross US 151, WIS 73 and junction with WIS 89 in Columbus as they enter Dodge County.

WIS 16 and WIS 60 turn east and pass through the unincorporated town of Astico and Lowell. WIS 16 leaves WIS 60 and joins WIS 26 at the junction of the two highways in Clyman. WIS 16 leaves WIS 26 and bypasses Watertown to the north and east and into Jefferson County. WIS 19 terminates on WIS 16 east of Watertown.

WIS 16 passes around Ixonia, becomes an expressway, and enters Waukesha County along a bypass of Oconomowoc. WIS 67 joins the expressway north of Oconomowoc. WIS 16 turns east onto the freeway segment and passes into Hartland, crossing WIS 83 there. WIS 190, also known as Capitol Drive, terminates at WIS 16 as the freeway turns south in Pewaukee. WIS 16 ends at a flyover interchange and its traffic merges onto I-94 east near Waukesha.

History

In 1918, today's alignment of WIS 16 was WIS 21 from La Crosse to New Lisbon, along with WIS 12 east of Tomah. The route from Kilbourn (Wisconsin Dells) to Clyman was WIS 29. WIS 26 followed its current alignment to Watertown and the route from Watertown to Waukesha was WIS 19. WIS 29 was extended westward to La Crosse when WIS 21 was truncated back to north of New Lisbon. When the U.S. Routes debuted in 1926, WIS 29 was removed from the books as the entire alignment was replaced by US 16. WIS 19 was truncated back to its current terminus.

The current eastern terminus of WIS 16 was the site of the dedication ceremonies for the first completed segment of Interstate 94 in Wisconsin. The segment was opened on September 4, 1958. The first major interchange on the new Interstate was originally where US 16 turned north towards Pewaukee and WIS 30 continued west with I-94. The section of US 16 between the interchange outside of Waukesha and downtown Milwaukee was truncated at the interchange in the 1960s. US 16's designation was removed from the route and replaced with the current WIS 16 in 1978.

The original WIS 16 followed present day WIS 29 from Chippewa Falls to Green Bay via Wausau and Shawano. The route then followed a route that would become US 141 to Manitowoc where it ended at then WIS 17 (present day WIS 42).

Oconomowoc bypass
The alignment of the eastern section of Highway 16 changed in late 2006 when the rest of the Oconomowoc bypass was opened to traffic. The four-lane, limited access divided highway routes Highway 16 around Lac La Belle on the west side of the city, meeting up with Highway 67 north of downtown. Eventually, the bypass will result in the removal of the state highway designation from Wisconsin Avenue through downtown Oconomowoc.

The signs for Highway 16 through downtown Oconomowoc have not yet been changed, due to the reconstruction of Wisconsin Avenue through the downtown area during the summer of 2008. As of November 2008, Oconomowoc officials and WisDOT had not yet set a firm date for the jurisdictional transfer, though it was likely that it will be done by the summer of 2009.

Currently, the limited-access highway around Oconomowoc is designated as Wisconsin Highway 16 on signage. Some signage, especially the signs located at the end of the freeway segment on West Highway 16 when a right turn must be made to continue on the bypass, say Bypass West Wisconsin Highway 16.

Major intersections

Related routes

Watertown business loop

Business State Trunk Highway 16 (Bus. WIS 16) follows a former alignment of US 16 through downtown Watertown. The route travels south along Bus. WIS 26 (North Church Street) and east along WIS 19 (Main Street). It was created as Business U.S. Highway 16 (Bus. US 16) in 1961, when US 16 was re-routed onto a bypass of Watertown.

See also

References

External links

Wisconsin Highway 16 at StateTrunkTour.com

016
Wisconsin
Freeways in the Milwaukee area
 Transportation in La Crosse County, Wisconsin
 Transportation in Monroe County, Wisconsin
 Transportation in Juneau County, Wisconsin
 Transportation in Sauk County, Wisconsin
 Transportation in Columbia County, Wisconsin
 Transportation in Dodge County, Wisconsin
 Transportation in Jefferson County, Wisconsin
 Transportation in Waukesha County, Wisconsin